Jéssica Pereira (born 12 September 1994) is a Brazilian judoka.

She is the bronze medallist of the 2018 Judo Grand Slam Ekaterinburg in the -52 kg category.

References

External links

 

1994 births
Living people
Brazilian male judoka
20th-century Brazilian women
21st-century Brazilian women